Gaza olivacea is a species of sea snail, a marine gastropod mollusk in the family Margaritidae.

Description
The size of the shell varies between 25 mm and 45 mm.

Distribution
This species occurs in the Caribbean Sea, the Gulf of Mexico and the Atlantic Ocean off Brazil at depths between 238 m and 808 m.

References

 Quinn, J. F. Jr. 1991. New species of Gaza, Mirachelus, Calliotropis, and Echinogurges (Gastropoda: Trochidae) from the northwestern Atlantic Ocean. Nautilus 105: 166-172
 Rosenberg, G., F. Moretzsohn, and E. F. García. 2009. Gastropoda (Mollusca) of the Gulf of Mexico, Pp. 579–699 in Felder, D.L. and D.K. Camp (eds.), Gulf of Mexico–Origins, Waters, and Biota. Biodiversity. Texas A&M Press, College Station, Texas

External links
 To Encyclopedia of Life
 To USNM Invertebrate Zoology Mollusca Collection
 To World Register of Marine Species
 

olivacea
Gastropods described in 1991